Reveille can refer to:

 Reveille, the bugle call
 Reveille (dog), the Texas A&M mascot

Geography
 Reveille (Pulaski, Tennessee),  listed on the National Register of Historic Places in Giles County, Tennessee
 Reveille (Richmond, Virginia),  listed on the National Register of Historic Places in Richmond, Virginia

Film and TV
 Reveille Productions, one of three television production companies which were subsumed into Endemol Shine North America
 "Reveille" (NCIS), an episode of the CBS show NCIS
 Reveille (film), by George Pearso

Books
 The Daily Reveille, the Louisiana State University student newspaper
 Reveille (newspaper), a defunct British tabloid
 "Reveille", the title of a poem by A. E. Housman

Music
 "Reveille", for violin and piano by Benjamin Britten
 Reveille (band), the nu metal band
 Reveille (album), by the band Deerhoof
 "Reveille", art song on the Housman poem by Graham Peel (1877-1937) 
 "Réveille", a French song by Zachary Richard about the Acadian Deportation
 "The Reveille", a song for male voice chorus composed in 1907 by Edward Elgar to words by Bret Harte